Trueperella pyogenes is a species of nonmotile, facultatively anaerobic, Gram-positive bacteria. The cells typically measure 0.5 by 2.0 μm.  They appear as pleomorphic or coccoid rods.  They tend to be grouped singly or in short chains but are sometimes grouped into V-shaped pairs.

T. pyogenes is found in the urogenital, gastrointestinal, and upper respiratory tracts of cattle, goats, horses, musk deer, pigs, and sheep, in which it may cause abscesses, mastitis, metritis, and pneumonia. Although it can thrive in either anaerobic or aerobic environments, it is ideally suited to one with high (about 7%) levels of carbon dioxide.

When the genus Arcanobacterium was split into two (Arcanobacterium and Trueperella gen. nov.), the new genus name was chosen in honor of German microbiologist . The specific name pyogenes, used in various bacterial genera, was derived from the Greek  puon or Latin pyum and suffix -genes, yielding pyogenes, meaning "pus-producing".

Although it can infect a wide variety of tissues, Trueperella pyogenes is the most common cause of "summer mastitis" in cattle and pyometra in dogs.

References

Actinomycetales
Bacteria described in 1903